Charles A. "Jack" Wright (October 30, 1871 – October 27, 1931) was an American college football player and coach. He served as the head football coach at the University of Rochester in 1897, the University of Washington in 1901, and Kentucky State College—now known as the University of Kentucky—in 1903, compiling a career college football coaching record of 10–4. Wright earned a degree from Columbia Law School in 1902 and later worked as a judge. He died in 1931 after suffering a heart attack. At the time of his death, he was candidate for the Cayuga County judge as well as the city recorder for Auburn, New York.

Head coaching record

References

External links
 

1871 births
1931 deaths
19th-century players of American football
American football guards
Columbia Lions football coaches
Columbia Lions football players
Kentucky Wildcats football coaches
Rochester Yellowjackets football coaches
Washington Huskies football coaches
Williams Ephs football players
Columbia Law School alumni
People from Auburn, New York
People from Moravia, New York
Coaches of American football from New York (state)
Players of American football from New York (state)
New York (state) lawyers